Bornasco is a comune (municipality) in the Province of Pavia in the Italian region Lombardy, located about 25 km south of Milan and about 11 km northeast of Pavia.  
 
Bornasco borders the following municipalities: Ceranova, Giussago, Lacchiarella, Lardirago, San Genesio ed Uniti, Sant'Alessio con Vialone, Siziano, Vidigulfo, Zeccone.

References

External links

Official website

Cities and towns in Lombardy